Lan Kwai Fong (often abbreviated as LKF) is a small square of streets in Central, Hong Kong. The area was dedicated to hawkers before the Second World War, but underwent a renaissance in the mid-1980s. It is now a popular expatriate haunt in Hong Kong for drinking, clubbing and dining. The street Lan Kwai Fong is L-shaped with two ends joining with D'Aguilar Street.

Location
Lan Kwai Fong as an area is defined by D'Aguilar Street and the smaller lane, Lan Kwai Fong, an L-shaped, cobble-stoned lane. Both streets turn 90 degrees to form a rectangle. It is near the Mid-Levels. Its eating and drinking establishments are considered upmarket in price and the area is also considered a tourist spot. From the west side of the rectangle, Wo On Lane and Wing Wah Lane extend to host several more spots for drinks and food. The area arguably extends to Wellington Street and Wyndham Street, through to the Hong Kong Fringe Club. It is also home to a small number of art galleries.

History
Before the Second World War, Lan Kwai Fong was dedicated to hawkers.

In early days, the square housed many mui yan, or marriage arrangers, a role exclusively held by females. Mui yan were marriage intermediaries between two families in traditional times. It was thus known as Mui Yan Hong or Hung Leung Hong. 

After the opening of the disco club "Disco Disco" by Gordon Huthart on 23 December 1978 in the basement of 40 D'Aguilar Street, the development of the Lan Kwai Fong area accelerated, making it famous all over the world. The disco club was once popular among celebrities and expats, but then it was closed in 1986. 

Inspired by Montreal's Crescent Street, the Montreal-raised businessman Allan Zeman decided to open a restaurant called "California" on Lan Kwai Fong in 1983 since he believed that expats in Hong Kong at the time needed more places for hangouts.  Since then, he has been nicknamed "the Father of Lan Kwai Fong" (蘭桂坊之父). 

Between 2011 and 2015, a massive change was underway, following Zeman's decision to replace his block in Lan Kwai Fong. This led to a substantial area of Lan Kwai Fong becoming a construction site.

Special occasions
The crowds during special occasions such as Halloween or New Year's Eve put the place at a literal standstill with the large numbers. Police control is employed at such times, to manage the crowds.

Street culture
In recent years, street performing has become a new scene in Hong Kong's street culture. Some of the performers decide to set their stages at Lan Kwai Fong, usually with the medium of singing and playing guitar in an acoustic setting.

New Years Eve tragedy

On 1 January 1993, 21 people were killed and 62 injured in a large-scale human crush incident whilst celebrating the New Year's Day in Lan Kwai Fong.

More than 15,000 people were crammed into the area for the New Year countdown at the time. As midnight approached, increasing rowdiness caused the crowd to collapse in on itself,  The Hong Kong government appointed then-Court of First Instance judge Kemal Bokhary to conduct an inquest into the disaster. The stringent crowd control measures now in force at major holidays and events are a direct consequence of the inquest's recommendations.

Transport
There are several ways to access Lan Kwai Fong other than taxi, which include:

Public transport

MTR, Central station, Exit "D2"
Airport Express, Hong Kong station, Exit "B2" or "C"
Public bus, route no. 12M, 13 and 40M

See also
 List of places in Hong Kong
 List of restaurant districts and streets
 List of streets and roads in Hong Kong
 Mid-Levels
 SoHo, Hong Kong
 Tourism in Hong Kong
 Wan Chai
 Melvis

References

External links

Official website of Lan Kwai Fong Association
Official website of Lan Kwai Fong Group
Official website of Lan Kwai Fong Entertainments
 

Central, Hong Kong
Tourist attractions in Hong Kong
Restaurant districts and streets in Hong Kong
Human stampedes in 1993
1993 in Hong Kong
Roads on Hong Kong Island